Watkins Mill may refer to three things in the United States:

 Watkins Woolen Mill State Park and State Historic Site in Missouri
 Watkins Mill High School in Montgomery County, Maryland
 Watkins Mill Town Center, a proposed development in Gaithersburg, Maryland